Before the Act of Union 1707, the barons of the shire of Forfar (now called Angus) elected commissioners to represent them in the unicameral Parliament of Scotland and in the Convention of Estates. The number of commissioners was increased from two to four in 1693.

After 1708, Forfarshire returned one member to the House of Commons of Great Britain and later to the House of Commons of the United Kingdom.

List of shire commissioners

 1600: David Carnegie of Kinnaird
 1605 (convention): David Carnegie of Kinnaird
 1605: Sir James Scrymgeour of Dudhope
 1609 (convention): David Carnegie of Kinnaird
 1612: Collace of Balnamoon
 1612: Sir John Scrymgeour of Dudhope
 1617 (convention and parliament): Haliburton of Pitcur
 1617: Sir John Scrymgeour of Dudhope
 1621: Fothringham of Powrie-Fothringham
 1621: Sir John Scrymgeour of Dudhope
 1628-1633: Sir William Graham of Claverhouse
 1628-1633: Sir Harie Wood of Bonytown
 1630 (convention): Sir Alexander Erskine of Dune
 1630 (convention): James Lyon of Auldbarr
 1639-1641: Sir Alexander Erskine of Dune
 1639-1641: James Lyon of Auldbarr (died in office)
 1641: Sir David Graham of Fintrie
 1644 (convention and parliament): Crichton of Ruthven
 1644 (convention): Frederick Lyon of Brigton
 1644-1647: Frederick Lyon of Brigton
 1645: Sir Alexander Erskine of Dune
 1645-1647: Sir John Carnegie of Craig
 1646-1647: Sir Andrew Fletcher of Innerpeffer
 1646-1647: Graham of Monorgund
 1648: Sir Andrew Fletcher of Innerpeffer
 1649: John Lindsay of Edzell
 1649: George Symmer of Balzeordie
 1650-1651: George Lundie
 1650-1651: Henry Maule of Melgund
 1661-1663: Sir John Carnegie of Boysack
 1661-1663: Sir James Ogilvy of Newgrange
 1665 (convention): David Fothringham of Powrie
 1665 (convention): Sir David Ogilvy of Inverquharity
 1667 (convention): John Gardyne of Lautoune
 1667 (convention): James Maule, fiar of Melgum
 1669-1674: James Carnegie of Balnamoon
 1669-1672: Sir David Ogilvy of Clova
 1678 (convention): David Lindsay of Edzell
 1678 (convention): Sir David Ogilvy of Inverquharity
 1681-1682: James Carnegie of Balnamoon
 1681-1682: Sir David Ogilvy of Clova
 1685-1686: James Carnegie of Balnamoon
 1685-1686: Sir David Falconer of Newtown (died in office December 1685)
 1686: James Carnegie of Findhaven
 1689 (convention): James Brodie of that Ilk
 1689 (convention): David Erskine of Dun
 1689 (convention): Sir George Mackenzie of Rosehaugh
 1689-1698: David Erskine of Dun (died in office)
 1689-1691: Sir George Mackenzie of Rosehaugh (died in office)
 1689-1702: Robert Reid of Baldovie
 1693-1698: John Fullarton of Kinnaber (died in office) 
 1693-1698: James Milne of Ballwylloe (expelled) 
 1698-1702: James Scott the younger of Logie
 1698-1702: James Carnegie of Findhaven
 1702-1707: James Carnegie of Findhaven
 1702-1707: David Graham of Fintrie, younger
 1702-1707: James Haliburton of Pitcur
 1702-1707: Patrick Lyon of Auchterhouse

References
 Joseph Foster, Members of Parliament, Scotland (2nd edition, 1882)

Constituencies of the Parliament of Scotland (to 1707)
Politics of the county of Forfar
History of Angus, Scotland
Constituencies disestablished in 1707
1707 disestablishments in Scotland